Calligrapha is a genus of large American Chrysomelinae (a subfamily of leaf beetles) of imprecise taxonomic boundaries. Most species occur in Central and South America.

Species
There are at least 50 species within this genus.

Gallery

References

External links
 Images of some Calligrapha species at BugGuide.net
 

Chrysomelidae genera
Chrysomelinae
Taxa named by Louis Alexandre Auguste Chevrolat
Beetles of North America
Beetles of South America